Hatboro (known locally as the Boro) is a borough in Montgomery County, Pennsylvania, United States. The population was 8,238 at the 2020 census.

History

The town of Hatboro is located on land purchased from William Penn by the family of Nicholas More around 1705. The first land titles in town were issued in 1711. Original construction by early residents of the town occurred between 1715 and 1719. Early settlement pre-dating the Hatboro name occurred in the Crooked Billet area east of York Road, between Moreland Avenue and Byberry Road.

Early resident John Dawson entertained guests at the Crooked Billet Inn as well as manufacturing a line of hats. When the post office opened in 1809 the town was officially called Hatborough. U.S. Postmaster General John Wanamaker officially changed the name of the town in the 1880s to Hatboro.

The Union Library Company of Hatboro, the third library company to be founded in Pennsylvania, was formed in 1755. This building still stands on its original site today and still serves as a library. George Washington and his troops passed through the town numerous times during 1777 in pursuit of British Troops.  The Battle of Crooked Billet was fought in 1778.

The year 1811 saw the construction of the Loller Academy, the first bank was built in 1873, and railroad service connected to Hatboro in 1874.

The Loller Academy, Roberts and Mander Stove Company Buildings, and Union Library Company are listed on the National Register of Historic Places.

Geography
Hatboro is located at  (40.177635, -75.104424). 

The Borough of Hatboro is a small municipality that is surrounded by Upper Moreland Township in Montgomery County to the west, south, and east; and Warminster Township in Bucks County to the north. The Pennypack Creek runs through the center of town under Pennsylvania Route 263 (York Road) and through the municipality.

Climate
The climate in this area is characterized by hot, humid summers and generally mild to cool winters. According to the Köppen Climate Classification system, Hatboro has a humid subtropical climate, abbreviated "Cfa" on climate maps.

Demographics

2010 census
As of the census of 2010, the borough was 92.4% White, 2.7% Black or African American, 0.3% Native American, 1.6% Asian, and 1.6% were two or more races. 4.3% of the population were of Hispanic or Latino ancestry

2000 census
As of the census of 2000, there were 7,393 people, 3,041 households, and 1,955 families residing in the borough. The population density was 5,217.5 people per square mile (2,010.2/km2). There were 3,121 housing units at an average density of 2,202.6 per square mile (848.6/km2). The racial makeup of the borough was 95.74% White, 1.95% African American, 0.14% Native American, 1.06% Asian, 0.58% from other races, and 0.54% from two or more races. Hispanic or Latino of any race were 1.45% of the population.

There were 3,041 households, out of which 30.7% had children under the age of 18 living with them, 49.3% were married couples living together, 10.7% had a female householder with no husband present, and 35.7% were non-families. 30.8% of all households were made up of individuals, and 13.9% had someone living alone who was 65 years of age or older. The average household size was 2.43 and the average family size was 3.07.

In the borough the population was spread out, with 24.0% under the age of 18, 6.6% from 18 to 24, 33.0% from 25 to 44, 21.2% from 45 to 64, and 15.1% who were 65 years of age or older. The median age was 38 years. For every 100 females there were 92.3 males. For every 100 females age 18 and over, there were 88.4 males.

The median income for a household in the borough was $44,901, and the median income for a family was $58,063. Males had a median income of $37,291 versus $30,934 for females. The per capita income for the borough was $21,911. About 1.8% of families and 3.3% of the population were below the poverty line, including 3.4% of those under age 18 and 7.5% of those age 65 or over.

Parks and recreation

Public parks serving the borough of Hatboro include Hatboro Memorial Park, Eaton Park, Tanner Park, Miller Meadow, Blair Mill Park (home of the Hatboro Little League baseball fields), and Celano Park. The Hatboro Memorial Pool is located adjacent to Hatboro Memorial Park and is open during the summer from Memorial Day weekend to Labor Day weekend. The pool offers a water slide, a baby pool, and a dew drop. The Hatboro Memorial Pool offers day passes and season memberships, with lower rates for borough residents, and has a swim team.

Politics and government

Hatboro has a city manager form of government with a mayor and a seven-member borough council.
Mayor - Tim Schultz (D)
Council President - George Bollendorf, Jr. (D)
Council Vice President - Dave Stockton (D)
Council Pro Tempore - Nicole McMenamin (D)
Councilperson - Aleta Ostrander (D)
Councilperson - Nicole Sutton-Reichner (D)
Councilperson - Alex Myers (D)
Councilperson - Amanda Jacobus (D)

The borough is part of the:
 Fourth Congressional District (represented by Rep. Madeleine Dean)
 Pennsylvania's 152nd State House District (represented by Rep. Nancy Guenst).
 Pennsylvania's 12th State Senate District (represented by Sen. Maria Collett).

The borough maintains the Hatboro Police Department, which provides police services to Hatboro. The Hatboro Police Department is composed of the Chief of Police, five Sergeants, eight Patrol Officers, three Police Operations Clerks, a Secretary, and five school crossing guards. Fire protection in Hatboro is provided by the Enterprise Fire Company of Hatboro, a volunteer fire company. Emergency Medical Services in Hatboro and surrounding areas is provided by the Second Alarmers Rescue Squad, which maintains a station in the borough.

Education
Hatboro is served by the Hatboro-Horsham School District, along with Horsham Township. One of the district's elementary schools, Crooked Billet Elementary School, is located in the borough. The remainder of the schools, including Keith Valley Middle School and Hatboro-Horsham High School, are in Horsham Township.

Infrastructure

Transportation

The main north–south road in Hatboro is Pennsylvania Route 263 (York Road), which serves as the town's main street. Pennsylvania Route 332 begins at PA 263 in Hatboro and heads east on Montgomery Avenue and northeast on Jacksonville Road. The main east–west street in Hatboro is Moreland Avenue. Other important roads in Hatboro include County Line Road (which runs along the northern border with Warminster Township in Bucks County), Warminster Road (which runs along the eastern border with Upper Moreland Township), Byberry Road, and Horsham Road. The Willow Grove interchange of the Pennsylvania Turnpike (Interstate 276) is nearby in Upper Moreland Township.

SEPTA provides Regional Rail service to the borough at the Hatboro station along the Warminster Line which runs between Warminster and Center City Philadelphia. SEPTA City Bus Route 22 serves Hatboro along York Road, running between Warminster and the Olney Transportation Center in North Philadelphia.

Parking in the downtown area of Hatboro is regulated by on-street parking meters and public off-street parking lots using multi-space parking meters. The borough also maintains a paid parking lot for commuters near the Hatboro station along with on-street parking meters along Jacksonville Road near the train station.

Utilities
Electricity and natural gas in Hatboro is provided by PECO Energy Company, a subsidiary of Exelon. Water in Hatboro is provided by Aqua Pennsylvania, a subsidiary of Aqua America. The Upper Moreland-Hatboro Joint Sewer Authority provides sewage service to Hatboro along with neighboring Upper Moreland Township. The Hatboro Borough Public Works Department provides trash and recycling collection to the borough. Cable, telephone, and internet service to the area is provided by Xfinity and Verizon. Hatboro is served by area codes 215, 267, and 445.

Notable people
Jill Biden — First Lady of the United States (2021–present) 
Roy Cornell — Representative for Pennsylvania House of Representatives, District 152 from 1979 until his death in 2004.
Susan Cornell — Daughter of Roy Cornell and Representative for Pennsylvania House of Representatives, District 152 from 2004 to 2006.
Séamus Egan — Irish musician.
Greg Erwin — Former crew chief for Wood Brothers Racing driver Matt DiBenedetto in the NASCAR Cup Series.
Isaac Newton Evans — U.S. Representative for Pennsylvania's 7th congressional district from 1883 to 1887.
Nancy Guenst — Representative for Pennsylvania House of Representatives, District 152 from 2020 to present, Mayor of Hatboro from 2018 to 2020.
Tom Murt — Representative for Pennsylvania House of Representatives, District 152 from 2007 to 2020.
Kurt VolkerDiplomat and U.S. Ambassador to NATO
Steve YerkesMajor League Baseball player

References

External links

 Borough of Hatboro official website
 Greater Hatboro Chamber of Commerce official website
 The Millbrook Society historical society

Populated places established in 1705
Boroughs in Montgomery County, Pennsylvania
1715 establishments in Pennsylvania